Josef Ignaz Mildorfer (13 Oct 1719, Innsbruck – 8 Dec 1775, Vienna), was an Austrian painter.

Biography
Mildorfer was born in Innsbruck, and was initially trained by his father Michael Ignaz Mildorfer. He later apprenticed with Paul Troger. In 1745 Mildorfer became a member of the Academy of Fine Arts Vienna, and starting in 1751 taught as a professor of painting. That same year he was appointed court painter to Princess Eleonora of Savoy, where he was commissioned to paint frescoes for the Menagerie Pavilion at Schönbrunn. Mildorfer primarily painted religious-themed altarpieces and frescoes.

References

18th-century Austrian painters
18th-century Austrian male artists
Austrian male painters
1719 births
1775 deaths
Artists from Innsbruck

Catholic painters